"Kaw-Liga" is a country music song written by Hank Williams and Fred Rose.

Background
Hank Williams was from Alabama, and would vacation on Lake Martin. The Lake Martin-area was once the home of Kowaliga, a former unincorporated town and a historically African-American community that was active from roughly 1890 until the mid-1920s. When the song was written it was originally Kowaliga, but Fred Rose changed the spelling to "Kaw Liga" in order to focus on the storyline. In 1953, "Kowaliga Day" was proclaimed by Alexander City Mayor Joe Robinson.

"Kaw-Liga" is one of just a handful of songs that Williams wrote with Fred Rose, who produced his records and published his songs through his company Acuff-Rose.  Rose often "doctored" the songs Williams composed, making suggestions and revisions, with biographer Roger M. Williams (no known relation) noting that Rose's contribution to Williams' songs was probably craftsmanship, whereas Williams' was genius.  Roy Acuff later recalled:

Content
The song tells the story of a wooden Indian, Kaw-Liga, who falls in love with an "Indian maid over in the antique store" but does not tell her so, being, as the lyrics say:

The Indian maid waits for Kaw-Liga to signal his affection for her, but he either refuses or is physically/emotionally unable (interpretations vary) to talk. Some interpret Kaw-Liga as a stoical Native American stereotype; however, the subject of masculine pride and emotional hardness is a popular one in country music, and the then-common "dime-store Indians" (which were the store's way of advertising that they sold tobacco) being made of unmoving wood was a perfect symbol of an aversion to expression of emotion. Because of his stubbornness, Kaw-Liga's love continues to be unrequited, with Hank Williams, the narrator/singer of the song lamenting,

The song ends with the Indian maid being bought and taken away from the antique store by a buyer, leaving Kaw-Liga alone, and he

Recording and release
The song was recorded during Williams' final recording session on September 23, 1952 at Castle Studio in Nashville. The session also produced "I Could Never Be Ashamed of You," (written for his soon-to-be wife Billie Jean), "Take These Chains From My Heart" (also written by Rose), and Williams' signature ballad "Your Cheatin' Heart."  ' More than any other song, "Kaw-Liga" bears evidence of the guiding hand of Rose, who moulded the song into nothing like Williams had recorded up to that point.  It begins in a minor key, which modulates into a major key on the chorus, and also features big-band drummer Farris Coursey, who had played brushes on Williams' previous song "Moanin' the Blues" and played in WSM's dance band.  In addition, the song fades out, the only Hank Williams song to do so.  Williams is also backed by Tommy Jackson (fiddle), Don Helms (steel guitar), Chet Atkins (lead guitar), Jack Shook (rhythm guitar), and Floyd "Lightnin'" Chance (bass).  The single was released posthumously in January 1953 on the MGM Records label and it remained No. 1 on the Billboard Country chart for 14 weeks. The flipside, "Your Cheatin' Heart, remained at No. 1 on the country chart for 6 weeks.

A demo version of Williams singing "Kaw-Liga" with just his guitar, likely recorded in 1951, is also available. On the recording, Williams misplays a chord and can be heard muttering "shit" before starting the song again.

Other versions
Marty Robbins included it as the opening track of his self-titled 1958 LP.
Johnny and the Hurricanes released an instrumental version of the song in 1963. 
The hillbilly comedy duo Homer and Jethro included a parody entitled "Poor Ol’ Koo-liger" on their 1963 album The Humorous Side of Country Music.  This album also included a parody of "Your Cheatin’ Heart", which they transformed into "Your Clobbered Heart".
Del Shannon recorded it for his 1964 album Del Shannon Sings Hank Williams.
Charley Pride took a live version of the song to No. 3 on the country singles chart in 1969.
Loretta Lynn recorded it in 1969.
Roy Orbison recorded it for his tribute album Hank Williams the Roy Orbison Way in 1970.
Doc Watson recorded a version for his 1974 album Two Days in November.
Hank Williams's son, Hank Williams Jr., recorded a cover which peaked at number twelve on the Billboard country singles chart in the summer of 1980.  Williams Jr. also performed the song on a television special with Johnny Cash.
The avant-garde band The Residents recorded the song for their 1986 album Stars & Hank Forever: The American Composers Series, replacing its original backing music with the bassline of Michael Jackson's Billie Jean.  This may have been a reference to Williams' wife, who was named Billie Jean.
Roy Clark and Joe Pass recorded a two-guitar instrumental version for their 1994 album Roy Clark and Joe Pass Play Hank Williams.
John Soderling recorded it for his 2018 album Old Hank's Country Songs.
M. H. Benders used it for a poem his 2022 book Gedichten om te Lezen in het Donker.

Bibliography

References

External links
Hank Williams Official Website

1952 songs
1953 singles
Hank Williams songs
Songs written by Hank Williams
Billboard Hot Country Songs number-one singles of the year
Charley Pride songs
Hank Williams Jr. songs
The Residents songs
Songs written by Fred Rose (songwriter)
Songs about Native Americans
Songs about heartache